Yeprem is an Armenian given name. It may refer to:

Yeprem Khan (1868–1912), born Yeprem Davidian, Iranian-Armenian revolutionary leader
Yeprem Philibosian, Armenian American philanthropist
 Yeprem I of Constantinople, Armenian Patriarch of Constantinople from 1684 to 1686; see List of Armenian Patriarchs of Constantinople

See also
Yepremyan / Yepremian, a surname